Rakshan more popularly known as VJ Rakshan (born 16 April 1991) is an Indian television presenter currently working with Star Vijay. He has hosted Kalakka Povathu Yaaru? seasons 5,6 and 7. He previously worked for Raj TV and Kalaignar TV. His debut film was En Kadhal Devathai with which although the movie was ready to release in 2011, it got released only in 2017. In 2020, he acted in a second movie Kannum Kannum Kollaiyadithaal directed by Desingh Periyasamy with Dulquer Salmaan playing the lead role.

Personal life
Rakshan's father died when he was a teenager. After completing his debut movie En Kadhal Devathai, he started his video jockey career in Raj TV. He is married to Saranya and has a daughter.

Filmography

Films

Web series

Television

Awards and nominations

References

External links
 

1991 births
Indian television presenters
Living people
Indian radio presenters
Indian stand-up comedians
Male actors from Chennai
People from Chennai